"Don't Count the Rainy Days" is a song written by Jerry Careaga and Wayland Holyfield, and recorded by American country music artist Michael Martin Murphey.  It was released in August 1983 as the lead single from the album The Heart Never Lies.  The song peaked at number 9 on the U.S. Billboard Hot Country Singles in early 1983 and at number 6 on the U.S. Billboard Bubbling Under Hot 100.

Cover versions
John Conlee recorded the song for his 1983 album In My Eyes.

Chart performance

References

1983 singles
John Conlee songs
Michael Martin Murphey songs
Songs written by Wayland Holyfield
Song recordings produced by Jim Ed Norman
Liberty Records singles
1983 songs